Alva Adams may refer to:

Alva Adams (governor) (1850–1922), governor of Colorado
Alva B. Adams (1875–1941), US Senator from Colorado